Kleerup is the debut album by Swedish recording artist and producer Kleerup, released in Sweden on 21 May 2008 by Virgin Records. Following the success of his collaboration with fellow Swede Robyn on 2007's "With Every Heartbeat", the album debuted and peaked at number seven on the Swedish Albums Chart. A revised edition of the album was released internationally in mid-2009.

"Thank You for Nothing" is an alternative, almost instrumental version of Cyndi Lauper's song "Lay Me Down", produced and co-written by Kleerup and included on Lauper's 2008 album Bring Ya to the Brink. "Until We Bleed" and "3AM" appeared, in altered forms, as B-sides to singles released by their vocalists (Lykke Li and Marit Bergman respectively).

Track listing

Swedish edition

International edition

Charts

Weekly charts

Year-end charts

Release history

References

2008 debut albums
Kleerup albums
Positiva Records albums
Virgin Records albums